Aliabad-e Sofla (also Romanized as ‘Alīābād-e Soflá) is a village in Rudbar Rural District, in the Central District of Rudbar-e Jonubi County, Kerman Province, Iran. At the 2006 census, its population was 294, in 52 families.

References 

Populated places in Rudbar-e Jonubi County